Bouzetia is a genus of flowering plants belonging to the family Rutaceae with only one species, Bouzetia maritima. Its native range is New Caledonia.

References

Rutaceae
Monotypic Rutaceae genera